Chapter 3: Citizenship.  The third chapter of the 1997 Constitution of Fiji, comprising Sections 8 through 20 of the Constitution, set out the rules for citizenship in Fiji.

The thirteen sections of Chapter 3 enunciate how citizenship may be acquired or forfeited, as well as how the Parliament may or may not legislate concerning this topic.  The inclusion of this in the Constitution is somewhat unusual: the constitutions of many countries leave the question of citizenship to be resolved by the legislature.  In Fiji, however, the complex history of immigration and colonial rule, together with hardline nationalist sentiments among certain sections of the ethnic Fijian population, has left various ethnic groups unsure of their permanent place in Fijian society, and wanted their right to citizenship entrenched in the Constitution rather than merely stated in some legal document that could be easily amended or even repealed at the whim of a legislative body.

Section 8 deals with the question of retention of existing citizenship:  all persons who were citizens of Fiji immediately prior to the adoption of this Constitution remain citizens.

Section 9 sets out four ways in which citizenship may be acquired, namely by birth, by registration, by naturalization, or by any other method prescribed by Parliament.

Sections 10 and 11 define how one is deemed to have Fijian citizenship by birth.  Every child born in Fiji on or after the date on which the Constitution took effect is deemed to be a citizen of Fiji, provided that at least one parent is a citizen, and that neither parent is an accredited diplomat of a foreign power.  An infant found abandoned in Fiji is deemed to have been born in Fiji, unless there is proof to the contrary.

Section 12 clarifies how one may acquire citizenship by registration.  Fiji has a long history of emigration, as well as immigration.  The number of Fiji citizens living abroad, along with their descendants, is not known, but is estimated to be in the order of several hundred thousand.  The provision for citizenship by registration guarantees the right of citizenship to any child born outside Fiji with at least one parent a Fiji citizen, to any foreign child under the age of 18 adopted by a Fiji citizen, to any child who was under the age of 21 when either parent became a citizen by registration, and to any spouse or former spouse of a Fiji citizen.  Applications for citizenship by registration may be made at any time during the child's lifetime.  Conditions apply: one registering for citizenship must be lawfully present in Fiji for a total of three out of the five years immediately prior to the application, and must renounce citizenship of any other country.

Section 13 sets out the conditions for acquiring citizenship by naturalization.  Anyone who does not qualify for citizenship by birth or registration may apply to be naturalized as a citizen, provided they have been lawfully present in Fiji for a total of five out of the ten years immediately prior to the application.

Sections 14 and 15 set out how Fiji citizenship may be lost or forfeited.  An adult who acquires citizenship of a foreign state forfeits Fiji citizenship.  A child acquiring foreign citizenship is permitted to have dual citizenship until reaching the age of 21, after which they have one year to make a final decision on which citizenship to keep.  Persons failing to renounce foreign citizenship by their 22nd birthday lose Fiji citizenship.  A citizen over the age of 21 may renounce Fijian citizenship provided that they have acquired citizenship of another country.

Section 16 deals with the residency rights of non-citizens.  Any former citizen, foreign wife or husband, widow or widower, of a Fiji citizen, or child of a Fiji citizen is entitle to enter and reside in Fiji, subject only to entry and residency conditions prescribed by Parliament.

Section 17 empowers Parliament to allow the acquisition of citizenship in other ways, in addition to those set out in the constitution, and to make administrative regulations covering applications for citizenship by registration or naturalization.

Section 18 allows the Parliament to specify the criteria for calculating the length of the period in which one has been lawfully resident in Fiji.

Section 19 empowers the government to strip a person of citizenship in a few limited circumstances.  If citizenship was "obtained by fraud, misrepresentation, or concealment of a material fact," the government may revoke citizenship.  Citizenship may also be revoked in the event of a Fiji citizen exercising "the entitlements of citizenship of another country".  This could include voting in a foreign election, serving in a foreign army, etc.

Section 20 contains three clauses, covering the cases of person born on dates where Fiji's constitutional situation was ambiguous.  From 28 September 1987 to 24 July 1990, Fiji functioned without a constitution.  Any child born in Fiji in that period is declared to be a citizen of Fiji.  Fiji had no constitutional government between 28 September and 6 October 1987; any child born abroad whose father was a citizen is taken to be a citizen.  Moreover, any person born in Fiji during the time in which the constitution prior to the present one was in operation, is deemed to be a citizen of Fiji, if he or she would otherwise be stateless."

1997 Constitution of Fiji